A quasiprobability distribution is a mathematical object similar to a probability distribution but which relaxes some of Kolmogorov's axioms of probability theory.  Quasiprobabilities share several of general features with ordinary probabilities, such as, crucially,  the ability to yield expectation values with respect to the weights of the distribution.  However, they can violate the σ-additivity axiom: integrating over them does not necessarily yield probabilities of mutually exclusive states.  Indeed, quasiprobability distributions also  have regions of negative probability density, counterintuitively, contradicting the first axiom.  Quasiprobability distributions arise naturally in the study of quantum mechanics when treated in phase space formulation, commonly used in quantum optics, time-frequency analysis,  and elsewhere.

Introduction 

In the most general form, the dynamics of a quantum-mechanical system are determined by a master equation  in Hilbert space:  an equation of motion for the density operator (usually written ) of the system.  The density operator is defined with respect to a complete orthonormal basis.  Although it is possible to directly integrate this equation for very small systems (i.e., systems with few particles or degrees of freedom), this quickly becomes intractable for larger systems.  However, it is possible to prove that the density operator can always be written in a diagonal form, provided that it is with respect to an overcomplete basis.  When the density operator is represented in such an overcomplete basis, then it can be written in a manner more resembling of an ordinary function, at the expense that the function has the features of a quasiprobability distribution.  The evolution of the system is then completely determined by the evolution of the quasiprobability distribution function.

The coherent states, i.e. right eigenstates of the annihilation operator  serve as the overcomplete basis in the construction described above.  By definition, the coherent states have the following property,

They also have some further interesting properties.  For example, no two coherent states are orthogonal.  In fact, if |α〉 and |β〉 are a pair of coherent states, then

Note that these states are, however, correctly normalized with〈α | α〉 = 1.  Owing to the completeness of the basis of Fock states, the choice of the basis of coherent states must be overcomplete.  Click to show an informal proof.

In the coherent states basis, however, it is always possible to express the density operator in the diagonal form

where f is a representation of the phase space distribution.  This function f is considered a quasiprobability density because it has the following properties:
 (normalization)
If  is an operator that can be expressed as a power series of the creation and annihilation operators in an ordering Ω, then its expectation value is
 (optical equivalence theorem).

The function f is not unique.  There exists a family of different representations, each connected to a different ordering Ω.  The most popular in the general physics literature and historically first of these is the Wigner quasiprobability distribution, which is related to symmetric operator ordering.  In quantum optics specifically, often the operators of interest, especially the particle number operator, is naturally expressed in normal order.  In that case, the corresponding representation of the phase space distribution is the Glauber–Sudarshan P representation.  The quasiprobabilistic nature of these phase space distributions is best understood in the  representation because of the following key statement:

This sweeping statement is inoperative in other representations.  For example, the Wigner function of the EPR state is positive definite but has no classical analog.

In addition to the representations defined above, there are many other quasiprobability distributions that arise in alternative representations of the phase space distribution.  Another popular representation is the Husimi Q representation, which is useful when operators are in anti-normal order.  More recently, the positive     representation and a wider class of generalized  representations have been used to solve complex problems in quantum optics.  These are all equivalent and interconvertible to each other, viz. Cohen's class distribution function.

Characteristic functions
Analogous to probability theory, quantum quasiprobability distributions
can be written in terms of characteristic functions,
from which all operator expectation values can be derived. The characteristic
functions for the Wigner, Glauber P and Q distributions of an N mode system
are as follows:

 
 
 

of the system. These characteristic functions can be used to directly evaluate expectation values of operator moments. The ordering of the annihilation and creation operators in these moments is specific to the particular characteristic function. For instance, normally ordered (annihilation operators preceding creation operators) moments can be evaluated in the following way from :

 

In the same way, expectation values of anti-normally ordered and symmetrically ordered combinations of annihilation and creation operators can be evaluated from the characteristic functions for the Q and Wigner distributions, respectively. The quasiprobability functions themselves are defined as Fourier transforms of the above characteristic functions. That is,

 

Here  and  may be identified as coherent state amplitudes in the case of the Glauber P and Q distributions, but simply c-numbers for the Wigner function. Since differentiation in normal space becomes multiplication in Fourier space, moments can be calculated from these functions in the following way:
 
 
 
Here  denotes symmetric ordering.  

These representations are all interrelated through convolution by Gaussian functions, Weierstrass transforms,

or, using the property that convolution is associative,

It follows that 

an often divergent integral, indicating P is often a distribution. Q is always broader than P for the same density matrix. 

For example, for a thermal state, 

one has

Time evolution and operator correspondences
Furthermore, as any master equation which can be expressed in Lindblad form is completely described by the action of combinations of annihilation and creation operators on the density operator, it is useful to consider the effect such operations have on each of the quasiprobability functions.

For the characteristic function of the P distribution we have
 

action corresponding action on the Glauber P function, we find

By following this procedure for each of the above distributions, the following
operator correspondences can be identified:
 
 
 
 

Here  or 1 for P, Wigner, and Q distributions, respectively.  In this way, master equations can be expressed as an equations of
motion of  quasiprobability functions.

Examples

Coherent state
By construction, P for a coherent state  is simply a delta function:

The Wigner and Q representations follows immediately from the Gaussian convolution formulas above,

The Husimi representation can also be found using the formula above for the inner product of two coherent states,

Fock state
The P representation of a Fock state  is

Since for n>0 this is more singular than a delta function, a Fock state has no classical analog.  The non-classicality is less transparent as one proceeds with the Gaussian convolutions.  If Ln is the nth Laguerre polynomial, W is

which can go negative but is bounded.  

Q,  by contrast,  always remains positive and bounded,

Damped quantum harmonic oscillator

Consider the damped quantum harmonic oscillator with the following master equation,
 

This results in the Fokker–Planck equation,

where κ = 0, 1/2, 1 for the P, W, and Q representations, respectively.  

If the system is initially in the coherent state , then this equation has the solution

References

Particle distributions
Quantum optics
Exotic probabilities